The following is an incomplete list of official city birds, organized by country.

Australia
Canberra - laughing kookaburra, Dacelo novaeguineae

Canada
Victoria, British Columbia - great blue heron, Ardea herodias (suggested, as yet unofficial) 
Vancouver, British Columbia - Anna's Hummingbird, Calypte anna

China
Guangzhou, Guangdong - hwamei, Garrulax canorus 
Xiamen, Fujian - egret, Ardea and Egretta

Ecuador
Quito - black-breasted puffleg, Eriocnemis nigrivestis

Finland
Rauma - great black-backed gull, Larus marinus

India
Mumbai, India - coppersmith barbet, Megalaima haemacephala
New Delhi, India - house sparrow, Passer domesticus

Indonesia
Surabaya, Indonesia - red junglefowl, Gallus gallus
Kediri, East Java - white-crested laughingthrush,  Garrulax leucolophus 
Batu, East Java - Javan myna, Acridotheres javanicus
Jakarta, Indonesia - Indonesian honeyeater, Lichmera limbata
North Maluku - dusky friarbird, Philemon fuscicapillus

Japan
Abiko, Chiba - Eurasian coot, Fulica atra 
Akabira, Hokkaido - varied tit, Sittiparus varius 
Aomori, Aomori - Japanese scops owl, Otus semitorques  (formerly rhinoceros auklet, Cerorhinca monocerata from 1901 to 2005 )
Chiba, Chiba - little tern, Sternula albifrons 
Chigasaki, Kanagawa - Japanese tit, Parus minor 
Chiyoda, Tokyo - mute swan, Cygnus olor 
Fuchu, Tokyo - Japanese skylark, Alauda japonica 
Fukuchi, Aomori - Japanese bush warbler, Horornis diphone 
Fukushima, Fukushima - Japanese tit, Parus minor 
Gotenba, Shizuoka - Japanese thrush, Turdus cardis 
Hachiōji, Tokyo - blue-and-white flycatcher, Cyanoptila cyanomelana 
Hadano, Kanagawa - Japanese bush warbler, Horornis diphone 
Hamamatsu, Shizuoka - barn swallow, Hirundo rustica 
Haramachi, Fukushima - Japanese skylark, Alauda japonica 
Hashikami, Aomori - Japanese bush warbler, Horornis diphone 
Himeji, Hyōgo - great egret, Ardea alba 
Hita, Oita - grey wagtail, Motacilla cinerea 
Hitachinaka, Ibaraki - Japanese bush warbler, Horornis diphone 
Hitoyoshi, Kumamoto - Japanese bush warbler, Horornis diphone 
Ichikawa, Chiba - Japanese bush warbler, Horornis diphone 
Ishioka, Ibaraki - Japanese skylark, Alauda japonica 
Itami, Hyogo - duck, Anas 
Kawagoe, Saitama - goose, Anser, Branta and Chen 
Kazuno, Akita - chicken, Gallus gallus (var. Koe Yoshi) 
Kizukuri, Aomori - lesser cuckoo, Cuculus poliocephalus 
Kōchi, Kōchi - Japanese wagtail, Motacilla grandis 
Koriyama, Fukushima - lesser cuckoo, Cuculus poliocephalus 
Koshigaya, Saitama - Eurasian collared dove, Streptopelia decaocto 
Kumamoto, Kumamoto - Japanese tit, Parus minor 
Kurashiki, Okayama - common kingfisher, Alcedo atthis 
Mito, Ibaraki - white wagtail, Motacilla alba 
Nagaokakyo, Kyoto - Japanese white-eye, Zosterops japonicus 
Namegawa, Saitama - green pheasant, Phasianus versicolor 
Nichinan, Miyazaki - common kingfisher, Alcedo atthis 
Ota, Tokyo - Japanese bush warbler, Horornis diphone 
Oyama, Tochigi - Japanese wagtail, Motacilla grandis 
Rokkasho, Aomori - white-tailed eagle, Haliaeetus albicilla 
Sakai, Osaka - bull-headed shrike, Lanius bucephalus 
Shizuoka, Shizuoka - common kingfisher, Alcedo atthis 
Tomakomai, Hokkaido - whooper swan, Cygnus cygnus 
Tosu, Saga - Japanese white-eye, Zosterops japonicus 
Tsukuba, Ibaraki - Japanese scops owl, Otus semitorques 
Yonago, Tottori - whooper swan, Cygnus cygnus 
Zama, Kanagawa - Japanese tit, Parus minor

Pakistan
Islamabad - rose-ringed parakeet, Psittacula krameri
Lahore - Lahori qabutar, Columba livia

Philippines
Buenavista, Bohol - black-naped oriole, Oriolus chinensis (antolihaw, dimodlaw) 
Consolacion, Cebu - black shama, Copsychus cebuensis 
Jagna, Bohol - black-naped oriole, Oriolus chinensis (antolihaw, dimodlaw) 
Pandan, Antique - writhed-billed hornbill, Aceros waldeni (dulungan) 
Santiago, Agusan del Norte - writhed-billed hornbill, Aceros waldeni (kalaw) 
Tagbilaran, Bohol - Philippine tailorbird, Orthotomus castaneiceps (tamsi)

Serbia
The eagle (see also Serbian eagle) is depicted in the coats of arms of Niš, Kraljevo, Leskovac, Užice, Valjevo. A dove is depicted in the coat of arms of Novi Sad.

South Korea
Asan - dove, Columba, Streptopelia 
Busan - black-tailed gull, Larus crassirostris 
Daegu - white-tailed eagle, Haliaeetus albicilla 
Gimcheon - Korean magpie, Pica sericea 
Gwangju - dove, Columba, Streptopelia 
Hanam - ring-necked pheasant, Phasianus colchicus 
Miryang - Korean magpie, Pica sericea 
Mokpo - red-crowned crane, Grus japonensis 
Pohang - black-tailed gull, Larus crassirostris 
Sacheon - black-tailed gull, Larus crassirostris 
Sangju - Korean magpie, Pica sericea 
Seongnam - Korean magpie, Pica sericea
Seoul - Korean magpie, Pica sericea
Suncheon - Oriental turtle dove, Streptopelia orientalis
Ulsan - great egret, Ardea alba
Yangsan - Korean magpie, Pica sericea

Taiwan
Keelung - crested serpent eagle, Spilornis cheela
Taichung - little egret, Egretta garzetta
Taipei - Formosan blue magpie, Urocissa caerulea

United States
Alabaster, Alabama - eastern bluebird, Sialia sialis
Aransas Pass, Texas - brown pelican, Pelecanus occidentalis
Bakersfield, California - American robin, Turdus migratorius
Berkeley, California - barn owl, Tyto alba  
Cape Coral, Florida - burrowing owl, Athene cunicularia
Chicago, Illinois - peregrine falcon, Falco peregrinus
Crystal City, Texas - wild turkey, Meleagris gallopavo
Deltona, Florida - Florida scrub jay, Aphelocoma coerulescens
Dunedin, Florida - osprey, Pandion haliaetus 
Galveston, Texas - reddish egret, Egretta rufescens
Harlingen, Texas - great kiskadee, Pitangus sulphuratus
Ingleside, Texas - great blue heron, Ardea herodias
Kenmore, Washington - great blue heron, Ardea herodias
Key West, Florida - chicken, Gallus gallus
La Plata, Maryland - Purple martin, "Progne subis"
Lake Forest, California - hummingbird, Trochilidae
Madison, Wisconsin - "plastic pink flamingo"
McAllen, Texas - green jay, Cyanocorax yncas
Mission, Texas - Couch's kingbird, Tyrannus couchii
Oakland, California - Black-crowned night heron, Nycticorax nycticorax 
Pine Lake, Georgia - belted kingfisher, Megaceryle alcyon
Port Aransas, Texas - roseate spoonbill, Platalea ajaja 
Portland, Oregon - great blue heron, Ardea herodias
Redondo Beach, California - "Goodyear blimp"
San Francisco, California - California quail, Callipepla californica
Santa Monica, California - brown pelican, Pelecanus occidentalis
Seattle, Washington - great blue heron, Ardea herodias
Shoreacres, Texas - great blue heron, Ardea herodias
St. Augustine, Florida - roseate spoonbill, Platalea ajaja 
Topeka, Kansas - western meadowlark, Sturnella neglecta
Villa Park, California - hummingbird, Calypte, Selasphorus
Washington, D.C. - wood thrush, Hylocichla mustelina

See also
List of national birds
List of U.S. state birds
List of national animals

Lists of birds